Isla is the second studio album by Portico Quartet, released in 2009.

Background 
Isla is Portico Quartet’s second studio album and the follow-up to Knee-Deep in the North Sea, their Mercury Prize-nominated debut album.

The album saw a continuation and refinement of the live acoustic sound developed in Knee-Deep in the North Sea. While those songs were written busking, the songs for Isla were written over a period of four winter months in the band’s garden shed. Reflecting this the album has a darker, more introspective tone than its predecessor.

Songs for the album were recorded in May 2009 at Abbey Road Studio 2. The album was produced by John Leckie. Electronic overdubs and string arrangements were added at Fish Factory Studios.

Artwork and design for the album was done by the drummer Duncan Bellamy, who has a degree in Fine Art from Central Saint Martins. The cover is a painting by Bellamy.

Critical reception 
Isla received widespread international acclaim upon its release.

The Observer highlighted their development in sound and that the album had "exceeded the unreasonable expectations prompted by their impressive debut…it is better focused and better executed…genuinely innovative".

Other reviewers noted the albums darker tone compared to its predecessor. Jazzwise commenting that it was a "highly atmospheric album" with a "haunting sonic texture" and "brooding ambience" that "is much more focused in intent". The BBC described a "deepier, scarier world" and Music OMH called it "hypnotic, sultry and mesmorising".

The album was also acclaimed for its fusing of genres. The Washington Post praised this "quietly impassioned set of originals that fuse elements of pop, jazz, classical and electronics music…wholly original, 21st century experimentalism that stirs both body and soul". Pop Matters wrote that "It’s one thing to crisscross musical genres. It’s another to make it sound like second nature" and Mojo highlighted the albums "glorious eclecticism…Isla feeds on Steve Reich mathematics, Radiohead dread, African desert grooves and ECM northern melancholy".

Track listing 
All songs composed, arranged and performed by Portico Quartet.
 Paper Scissors Stone – 5:27
 The Visitor – 5:31
 Dawn Patrol – 6:00
 Line – 7:30
 Life Mask (Interlude) – 1:16
 Clipper – 6:31
 Life Mask – 7:17
 Isla – 5:09
 Shed Song (Improv. No 1) – 8:23
The second printing of the album added "Subo’s Mental Meltdown" as an additional track. This was originally a bonus download track.

EP01 - Abbey Road 
A separate 2009 EP collected together bonus tracks and outtakes from the Isla sessions. 
 The Full Catastrophe - 7:18
 Line (Alternate Take 5) - 8:28
 Cap Gun - 3:09
 Su-Bo’s Mental Meltdown - 5:44

Personnel 
Jack Wyllie - saxophones, electronics

Milo Fitzpatrick - double bass

Duncan Bellamy - drums, piano

Nick Mulvey - hang drums, percussion

Produced and engineered by John Leckie

Mixed by John Leckie and Portico Quartet

Mastered by Steve Rooke at Abbey Road Studios.

String arrangements by Milo Fitzpatrick

Mizuka Yamamoto (violin), David Larkin (violin), Jose Gandia (viola), Greg Duggan (cello)

Painting, artwork and design by Duncan Bellamy

References 

Portico Quartet albums
2009 albums
Real World Records albums